Chvrches (stylised CHVRCHΞS and pronounced "Churches") are a Scottish pop band from Glasgow, formed in September 2011. The band consists of Lauren Mayberry, Iain Cook, Martin Doherty and, unofficially since 2018, Jonny Scott. Mostly deriving from the synth-pop genre, Chvrches also incorporate indietronica, indie pop, and electronic dance into their sound.

Two years after their formation, Chvrches released Recover EP in March 2013, which included hits "The Mother We Share" and "Recover". Their debut studio album, The Bones of What You Believe, was released on 20 September 2013, while the band was ranked fifth on the Sound of 2013 list by the BBC. Two years later, on 25 September 2015, the group released their second album, Every Open Eye. Their third album, Love Is Dead, was released on 25 May 2018. Their fourth album, Screen Violence, was released on 27 August 2021.

History

Origins and formation
In 2003, musicians Iain Cook and Martin Doherty met as students at the University of Strathclyde in Glasgow. Doherty was a member of the rock band Julia Thirteen, and asked Cook to produce some of the band's music. Although Julia Thirteen never recorded any further material, the experience proved vital, as Cook and Doherty formed a mutual partnership through music. A few years later, Doherty joined Cook as a member of the alternative rock band Aereogramme, but the two quit in 2007 when they became frustrated with the band's sound and lack of exposure. Doherty was then offered a role as a touring member of The Twilight Sad, but quit in 2012 after growing tired of playing someone else's music. The two had become jaded with alternative rock, and decided to start their own music project.

A few years after Cook left Aereogramme, he began listening to the American electronic music band Emeralds. Inspired, Cook bought a Minimoog Voyager and began "playing around with soundscapes and stuff like that...kind of with a view of doing stuff from the '80s". In September 2011, he produced an extended play for the band Blue Sky Archives, and asked vocalist and drummer Lauren Mayberry if she would be interested in singing backing vocals for an electronic music project he and Doherty were working on. Mayberry was intrigued by the offer, as neither of them had any background in electronic music. "For me it was nice to write over different instruments and not have to try to sing and scream over live drums and a Marshall bass stack," said Mayberry.

The three musicians quickly bonded, and spent the next few months writing and recording songs in a basement studio. During these sessions, Mayberry wrote the lyrics and hooks, Doherty provided melodic ideas, and Cook produced the songs. Once the sessions had concluded, the three decided that they worked well enough together to try and perform the songs as a band. The initial plan was to have Doherty sing lead vocals, while Mayberry would sing backing vocals. Mayberry was eventually promoted to lead vocalist after Cook and Doherty heard her singing abilities. In addition to her new role, Mayberry became the band's frontwoman, and gave the other members a reading list about the inner workings of the music industry.

The band members settled on the name Chvrches (stylised as CHVRCHΞS), which uses the Roman letter "v" instead of a "u". This spelling was chosen to differentiate themselves from actual churches in online search results. There was no conscious decision to have a name with religious connotations; instead, the band members felt that the name gave "a strong vibe that could be interpreted in many different ways". Mayberry also noted that the v is a subtle nod to band names from the influential witch house genre of music, including bands such as SALEM and Ritualz. "We did consider putting upside down crosses at either side of our name, but that would have dated us, I think" said Mayberry.

2012–2014: Breakthrough success, and The Bones of What You Believe 

Doherty noted how Chvrches began as a studio only project, saying: "There wasn't really any goal other than to put a song out on the internet and see what kind of response we got". In May 2012, Chvrches posted its debut song "Lies" on the Neon Gold Records blog. Instead of a picture of the band members, the song was accompanied by a picture of nuns in masks, which added to the perceived religiosity of the Chvrches name. The response was almost immediate; "Lies" reached number one on the MP3 aggregate blog The Hype Machine, and similarly received constant airplay on SoundCloud and BBC Radio 1. The band members were amazed by the reaction to "Lies". "It was unbelievable, way beyond what we expected," said Doherty.

Despite the popularity of "Lies", Chvrches had yet to perform a live show. There was a growing expectation that the band would eventually perform live, although the band members were anxious at the prospect. To curtail this fear, Chvrches played its first two live shows under the name Shark Week, before making its official debut at the Glasgow School of Art in July. When Chvrches began to attract A&R representatives, Mayberry was dismayed that most of them wanted to make her the central figure of the band; one representative called her the next Pixie Lott. From the beginning, the band's goal was to give equal treatment to all three members, and to not have any one person become the focal point. As Doherty stated: "We could have sold 200,000 more albums if we'd hidden Iain and I from view and put Lauren on the cover of every magazine. We ended up doing it in an indie band style. We broke through via word of mouth. It was about doing it in an honest, right way." This mentality meant that the band had to decline early offers for photo shoots and interviews that excluded Cook and Doherty.

Chvrches had already recorded eight other songs by the time "Lies" was released, in case listeners wanted to hear more music. One of these songs, "The Mother We Share", was released on 5 November 2012 as the band's debut single. "The Mother We Share" was similarly well received by listeners, and was downloaded more than 32,000 times by September 2013. Around this time, Chvrches co-manager Campbell McNeil attempted to contact Glassnote Records founder Daniel Glass, and gave Glass copies of "Lies" and another song called "Recover". After travelling to the UK to see Chvrches live, Glass signed the band to a recording contract in January 2013. To promote Chvrches, managers McNeil and Danny Rogers launched a nonstop touring schedule which included several international performances. Two months after signing with Glassnote, Chvrches made its North American debut at the South by Southwest festival in Austin, where the band won a Grulke Prize for best non-American act.

On 6 February 2013, Chvrches premiered the second single "Recover". It was followed by Recover EP, out on 25 March 2013 in the UK via Goodbye/Virgin and 26 March 2013 in the US via Glassnote. In March 2013 Chvrches performed at SXSW. They also won the Inaugural Grulke Prize (for Developing Non-US Act) at SXSW.

On 19 June 2013, Chvrches made their US TV debut performing "The Mother We Share" on Late Night with Jimmy Fallon. On 15 July 2013, they released the single "Gun". In July 2013 Chvrches supported Depeche Mode on four shows from The Delta Machine Tour 2013. In September 2013, they also performed "The Mother We Share" on Later... with Jools Holland.

On 23 September 2013, the band released their debut studio album The Bones of What You Believe on Virgin and Goodbye Records. On the critical aggregator website Metacritic, the album received a score of 80, based on 39 reviews.

On 30 September 2013, Mayberry penned an op-ed piece in The Guardian on what she perceived as sexist remarks directed towards her through the band's social media sites.

Chvrches covered Bauhaus' song "'Bela Lugosi's Dead" for the ending credits of the film Vampire Academy. "The Mother We Share" was featured in the opening video for the 2014 Commonwealth Games Opening Ceremony in Glasgow, Scotland, on 23 July 2014.

On 30 October 2014, BBC host Zane Lowe premiered "Get Away" as the first song from the re-scored soundtrack of the 2011 Nicolas Winding Refn's film, Drive.

2015–2016: Every Open Eye
The band started recording their second album in January 2015, and on 5 June 2015 announced they had completed work on it. Recording was conducted in the same Glasgow facility used for The Bones, which received a major upgrade to recording gear and an increase in the instrumental variety for the second album. If The Bones of What You Believe was recorded with the only three synths they had at that time (Minimoog Voyager, Prophet '08, Roland Juno-106), the success of the debut album allowed the band to follow their passion for synths by adding a lot more to play with on Every Open Eye: Korg MS-20 mini, Korg Polysix, Roland Jupiter-8, Moog Sonic Six, Oberheim OB-Xa and DSI Prophet 12.

On 16 July 2015, the band revealed the release date, cover art, and track listing for the new album, entitled Every Open Eye. The following day they released the album's first single, "Leave a Trace". The album was released on 25 September 2015.

On 12 August 2015, the second single, "Never Ending Circles", was released, and on 10 September 2015 the third single, "Clearest Blue", was also released. On 19 October 2015, the fourth single, "Empty Threat", was released. The music video was revealed on 20 November 2015.

On 31 March 2016, Chvrches made their debut at Royal Albert Hall as part of the Albert Sessions in an over two hours concert. The setlist included 17 songs from their first album and their follow-up: Every Open Eye.

Chvrches and Solar Fields penned the original song "Warning Call" for the 2016 video game Mirror's Edge Catalyst. The theme song was released on 13 May 2016.

In June 2016, a new version of "Bury It" featuring Hayley Williams was released the fifth and final single from Every Open Eye. The music video for the song was illustrated by Jamie McKelvie, featuring the band and Williams demonstrating telekinetic powers.

2017–2019: Love Is Dead
Chvrches began work on their third album in February 2017. The album was recorded in Los Angeles, New York City, and London. On 24 February 2017, Dave Stewart of Eurythmics revealed that he was in the studio working with the band. On 12 December, it was announced that Greg Kurstin had produced the album, and that work on the project was nearing completion Speaking about the album in an interview, Mayberry said "It's a typically Glaswegian thing to do, to feel the most misanthropic and macabre when you're in the sunniest place on earth."

To promote the upcoming album, the band wiped all of their social media pages, before posting a short video containing new music captioned "GET IN". The post was accompanied by a link to a Facebook Messenger page with the band. On 31 January 2018, BBC Radio 1's Annie Mac announced "Get Out" to be her Hottest Record in the World, giving the single its world premiere. The album also includes a song titled "My Enemy" featuring Matt Berninger of The National, released 28 February 2018. The track list was unveiled on 26 February 2018. On 29 March 2018, the band released "Never Say Die" as the third single from the album. On 10 April 2018, the band released "Miracle" as the fourth single from the album. Love Is Dead was released on 25 May 2018. On 9 October 2018, the band released "Graffiti" as the fifth single from the album.

In February 2019, the band was featured in a collaboration with the BBC Scottish Symphony Orchestra for the launch of the new BBC Scotland television channel. The channel's official launch on 24 February featured an orchestral performance of "Miracle".

In March 2019, the band collaborated with EDM artist Marshmello on the track "Here with Me".

In October 2019, the band released the original song "Death Stranding" as the lead single of the album Death Stranding: Timefall for the 2019 video game of the same title. Chvrches played the song with Game Awards Orchestra at the opening of The Game Awards 2019 ceremony.

2020–present: Screen Violence
Chvrches started working on their fourth album in February 2020. Martin Doherty and Lauren Mayberry worked on the album from Los Angeles while Iain Cook worked on the album from Glasgow. Chvrches started teasing the lead single for their fourth album, given the working title CHV4, on 9 April 2021. On 18 April 2021, Chvrches announced "He Said She Said" as the lead single for the album and it premiered on BBC Radio 1 on 19 April 2021. A second single, "How Not to Drown", featuring Robert Smith of the Cure, was released on 2 June 2021. The same day, the band announced their fourth album, Screen Violence, which was released on 27 August 2021. On 12 July 2021 they released the album's third and final single, "Good Girls". On 25 August 2021, the band performed "Good Girls" from the album Screen Violence on The Tonight Show Starring Jimmy Fallon.

After spending nearly a decade with Glassnote, Chvrches signed a deal with Island Records and EMI Records in 2022.

On 24 February 2023, Chvrches released the single "Over", the first to be released as part of their new record deal.

Musical style
Known for their clean sound, Chvrches' music style is usually tagged as synth-pop, electropop, pop, indie pop, indietronica, electronic rock, indie rock, alternative pop, electronica, and electronic. Neon Gold described their sound as "a godless hurricane of kinetic pop energy". Kitty Empire of The Observer wrote they "make accessible electro-pop that's only just short of truly brilliant". Wired noted following Every Open Eye's release that the album "cements the group as today's heir apparent to Depeche Mode, New Order, and other titans of British electronic music."

The band stated that their heroes were David Bowie, Depeche Mode, Iggy Pop, Siouxsie and the Banshees, Tangerine Dream, and Nick Cave. They have also been influenced by acts such as the Cure, Brian Eno, Madonna, Eurythmics, the National, Throbbing Gristle, Prince, Tubeway Army, Robyn, Lil Wayne, Laurie Anderson, Kate Bush, The Knife, Florence and the Machine, Cocteau Twins, Orchestral Manoeuvres in the Dark, Deftones, Cyndi Lauper, Whitney Houston, My Bloody Valentine, Elliott Smith, and the Prodigy.

Band members

 Lauren Mayberry – lead and backing vocals, drums, percussion, additional synthesizers (2011–present)
 Iain Cook – synthesizers, piano, guitars, bass, backing vocals (2011–present)
 Martin Doherty – synthesizers, samplers, piano, guitars, bass, backing and lead vocals (2011–present)

Touring musicians
 Jonny Scott – drums, percussion (2018–present)

Touring

When Chvrches plays live, Mayberry performs lead vocals and occasionally plays synthesisers and samplers. She also played drums as a part of their second album tour as seen in "Playing Dead", "Empty Threat", and "Under the Tide"; Cook plays synthesisers, guitar, bass, and also performs backing vocals; Doherty plays synthesisers and samplers, and also performs backing vocals and sometimes lead vocals. In 2018, the band's live line-up expanded to a four-piece by adding Jonny Scott on drums.

Chvrches tour globally and are active in the festival circuit, including Austin City Limits Music Festival, Bonnaroo, Canadian Music Fest, Coachella, Dia de los Deftones, Electric Castle, Electric Picnic, Field Day, Firefly Music Festival, Glastonbury, The Great Escape, Lollapalooza, Longitude, Lowlands, Melt! Festival, Music Midtown, Osheaga, Pitch Festival, Pukkelpop, Reading and Leeds Festival, Sasquatch! Music Festival, Summer Sonic, SXSW, Sziget Festival, T in the Park, Thrival Festival, TRNSMT, and the V Festival.

Chvrches was the opening act for Discopolis, Chew Lips, School of Seven Bells, Passion Pit, Two Door Cinema Club. They also supported Depeche Mode during their The Delta Machine Tour 2013 at Nîmes (16 July), Milan (18 July), Prague (23 July), and Warsaw (25 July).

Some of the artists that opened for Chvrches were Dan Croll, MØ, Isaac Delusion, Mansionair, Young Fathers, Arthur Beatrice, Conquering Animal Sound, Still Corners, City Calm Down, XXYYXX, Basecamp, Thumpers, Donna Missal, and The Range.

On 3 December 2015, Chvrches performed "Leave a Trace" at The Game Awards 2015 in Los Angeles, California, where they also announced the nominees for and winner of best indie game.

The band played the Bonnaroo Music Festival in June 2016, in Manchester, Tennessee, and Flow Festival, mid-August 2016, in Helsinki, Finland.

In October 2018, the band played Austin City Limits Music Festival. In December 2018 and January 2019, the band played KROQ Almost Acoustic Christmas annual concert at The Forum (Inglewood, California) and Falls Festival in Australia. In August 2019, the band played Summer Sonic Festival in Japan. On 12 December 2019, Chvrches performed Death Stranding at The Game Awards 2019 in Los Angeles, California.

On 11 November 2021, Chvrches began their Screen Violence album tour in North America and finished their first leg on 17 December. Chvrches second leg started with dates across the United Kingdom in March 2022.

Discography

 The Bones of What You Believe (2013)
 Every Open Eye (2015)
 Love Is Dead (2018)
 Screen Violence (2021)

Awards and nominations

See also 

 List of bands from Glasgow
 List of Scottish musicians

References

External links

 
Profile on Music Agency website

2011 establishments in Scotland
British indie pop groups
British synth-pop groups
Musical groups established in 2011
Musical groups from Glasgow
British musical trios
Scottish electronic rock musical groups
Scottish pop music groups
Virgin Records artists
Indietronica music groups
Glassnote Records artists
Female-fronted musical groups